The Men's Windy City Open 2016 was the men's edition of the 2016 Windy City Open, which was a PSA World Series event (prize money: 150 000 $). The event took place at the University Club of Chicago in the United States from 25 February to 2 March. Mohamed El Shorbagy won his first Windy City Open trophy, beating Nick Matthew in the final.

Prize money and ranking points
For 2016, the prize was $150,000. The prize money and points breakdown is as follows:

Seeds

Draw and results

See also
Women's Windy City Open 2016
Windy City Open

References

External links
PSA Windy City Open 2016 website
Windy City Open 2016 SquashSite page
Windy City Open 2016 official website

Windy City Open
Windy City Open
Windy City Open